Henry King (July 6, 1790 – July 13, 1861) was an American politician who served as a Jacksonian member of the U.S. House of Representatives for Pennsylvania's 7th congressional district from 1831 to 1833 and Pennsylvania's 8th congressional district from 1833 to 1835.

Biography
King was born in Palmer, Massachusetts.  He studied law in New London, Connecticut, and Wilkes-Barre, Pennsylvania.  He was admitted to the bar in 1815 and commenced practice in Allentown, Pennsylvania.  He was a member of the Pennsylvania State Senate for the 12th district from 1825 to 1830.

King was elected as a Jacksonian to the Twenty-second and Twenty-third Congresses.  He was not a candidate for renomination in 1834 to the Twenty-Fourth Congress.  He resumed the practice of law after leaving congress.  He died in Allentown in 1861 and is interred at the Union-West End Cemetery.

He was the brother of Georgia Congressman Thomas Butler King and uncle of Louisiana Congressman John Floyd King.

Notes

Sources

The Political Graveyard

|-

1790 births
1861 deaths
19th-century American politicians
Burials in Pennsylvania
Jacksonian members of the United States House of Representatives from Pennsylvania
Pennsylvania lawyers
Pennsylvania state senators
People from Palmer, Massachusetts
Politicians from Allentown, Pennsylvania